Walter G. O'Connell Copiague High School is an American four-year college preparatory public high school in the hamlet of Copiague in Suffolk County, New York. Commonly referred to as "Copiague High School," the school is named after its founder and first principal Walter G. O'Connell.

Walter G. O'Connell Copiague High School serves approximately 1,545 students in grades nine through twelve.

Extracurricular activities

Copiague High offers its students over 41 clubs to choose from throughout the academic year.

Athletics
Copiague High School's interscholastic athletics program offers its students the option of choosing from a wide range of sports throughout the school year. Teams compete in the Section 11, Division II League in both the junior and senior varsity levels.

Some of the sports available include :

References

External links
 

Public high schools in New York (state)
Educational institutions established in 1969
Schools in Suffolk County, New York